The fifth season of the sports entertainment reality competition series Australian Ninja Warrior premiered on 20 June 2021 on the Nine Network. The season is hosted by Rebecca Maddern, Ben Fordham, Shane Crawford and Nick Kyrgios.

Production
The Nine Network announced a fifth season on 16 September 2020. Casting applications are open until 30 November 2020. The series was again relocated, filming took place in Homebush, Sydney. In June 2021, Nine announced Nick Kyrgios would be joining the series as a sideline commentator alongside Shane Crawford, Andrew Flintoff didn't be returning due to travel challenges and a busy schedule. In October, it is announced that Ben Fordham won't return for season 6, opting to focus on his radio career.

Format Changes
Obstacle Choice - During the heats, each ninja warrior has the decision to choose between two obstacles courses, both leading to the warped wall, course A includes obstacles they have attempted before on previous seasons, whereas course B includes all new obstacles not attempted before.

Rounds

Underline represents the contestant who won the Fast Pass to the Grand Final in the qualifying heats as a result of winning the head to head competition on the Power Tower.

 represents the contestant who won the Safety Pass in the semi finals as a result of winning the head to head competition on the Power Tower.

Italics denotes female competitors.

Episode 1

Heat 1

This episode aired on 20 June 2021. Only five competitors completed this course, with a large number of athletes bowing out on the Flying Shelf Grab. Returning athlete Bryson Klein was given a fast pass to the Grand Final, after beating last season’s winner Ben Polson on the Power Tower.

Shrinking Steps
Big Dipper to Pole Rider
Cyclone Spinner
Obstacle A:
Flying Shelf Grab
Floating Monkey
Warped Wall
Obstacle B:
Ring Chaser
Clockwork
Warped Wall

Episode 2

Heat 2

This episode aired on 21 June 2021. Only five competitors completed this course, with a large number of athletes bowing out on the Beehive. Returning athlete Ashlin Herbert was given a fast pass to the Grand Final, after beating returning athlete Le Hua on the Power Tower.

Shrinking Steps
Big Dipper to Rope
Cyclone Spinner
Obstacle A:
Peg Board
Bar Hop
Warped Wall
Obstacle B:
Weight For It
Beehive
Warped Wall

Episode 3

Heat 3

This episode aired on 22 June 2021. Only four competitors completed this course, with a large number of athletes bowing out on the Cyclone Spinner. Returning athlete Charlie Robbins was given a fast pass to the Grand Final, after beating returning athlete Zak Stolz on the Power Tower.

Shrinking Steps
Big Dipper to Rope
Cyclone Spinner
Obstacle A:
Flying Shelf Grab
Floating Monkey
Warped Wall
Obstacle B:
Ring Chaser
Clockwork
Warped Wall

Episode 4

Heat 4

This episode will air on 28 June 2021. Only eight competitors completed this course, with a large number of athletes bowing out equally on the Bar Hop and Beehive. First time athlete Jimmy Burrows was given a fast pass to the Grand Final, after beating also first time athlete Dylan James on the Power Tower.

Shrinking Steps
Big Dipper to Pole Rider
Cyclone Spinner
Obstacle A:
Peg Board
Bar Hop
Warped Wall
Obstacle B:
Weight For It
Beehive
Warped Wall

Episode 5

Semi-final 1

This episode aired on 29 June 2021. Two competitors completed this course. Returning athlete Zak Stolz received a second chance advantage for the Grand Final, after beating Rob Patterson on the Power Tower.

Log Runner 
Double Dipper
Twin Trapeze
Flying Shelf Grab to Corkscrew
Dragon Back
Warped Wall
Wing Nuts
Spider Jump
Chimney Rope Climb

Episode 6

Semi-final 2

This episode aired on 30 June 2021. Three competitors completed this course. Returning athlete Jake Baker received a second chance advantage for the Grand Final, after beating Jack Wilson on the Power Tower.

Log Runner 
Double Dipper
Double Tilt Ladder
Flying Shelf Grab to Corkscrew
Dragon Back
Warped Wall
Basket Toss
Spider Jump
Chimney Rope Climb

Episode 7

Semi-final 3

This episode aired on 4 July 2021. Four competitors completed this course. Returning athlete Mike Snow received a second chance advantage for the Grand Final, after beating Alex Bigg on the Power Tower.

Log Runner 
Double Dipper
Pipe Climber
Flying Shelf Grab to Corkscrew
Dragon Back
Warped Wall
Spinball Wizard 
Spider Jump
Chimney Rope Climb

Episode 8

Grand Final, Stage 1

This episode aired on 5 July 2021. In order to move onto grand final 2 you had to complete the course. 10 Competitors managed complete this course within a time limit. The Power Tower did not appear in this episode

 Archers Steps
 Tri-Cycle
 Log Runner
 Ring Swing
 Tilting Ladders 
 Warped Wall
 Rolling Log
 Swinging Spikes
 Chimney Climb

Episode 9

Grand Final, Stage 2

This episode aired on 6 July 2021. In order to move onto grand final 2, you had to complete the course. Ten Competitors managed to complete this course. The Power Tower did not appear in this episode.

 Rolling Steel
 Salmon Ladder to Unstable Bridge
 I-Beam Gap
 Spin Hopper
 Dungeon
 Crazy Cliffhanger to Rope

Obstacles by episode

Heats (episodes 1-4)

Semi-Finals (episodes 5-7)

Grand Finals (episodes 8-9)

Viewership

References

Australian Ninja Warrior
2021 Australian television seasons